Mark Johnson (born 28 February 1969) is a South African former rugby union and professional rugby league footballer who represented South Africa in the 1995 Rugby League World Cup.

Playing career
Johnson originally played rugby union in South Africa before joining the London Crusaders, a rugby league club.

Johnson went on to play for Workington Town, Hull F.C. and the Salford City Reds.

Between 1995 and 2000 Johnson played seven tests for South Africa.

References

Living people
South African rugby league players
South Africa national rugby league team players
1969 births
London Broncos players
Workington Town players
Rugby league wingers
Salford Red Devils players
Hull F.C. players
South African rugby union players
South African expatriate rugby league players
Expatriate rugby league players in England
South African expatriate sportspeople in England